The 1909 LSU Tigers football team represented the LSU Tigers of Louisiana State University during the 1909 college football season. The LSU team posted a 6–2 record, losing to Southern Intercollegiate Athletic Association (SIAA) champion Sewanee and to an undefeated Arkansas. Notable victories include those over Mississippi and Alabama.

John W. Mayhew, a former halfback at Brown, took over as coach for former Vanderbilt lineman Joe Pritchard midway through the season. College Football Hall of Fame inductee Doc Fenton started at quarterback.

Schedule

Season summary

Jackson Barracks
The season opened with a 70–0 win over Jackson Barracks of New Orleans.

Ole Miss
In a hard-fought game, the Tigers beat the Ole Miss team, 10–0.

The starting lineup was Hall (left end), Hillman (left tackle), Ryan (left guard), Stovall (center), Thomas (right guard), Pollock (right tackle), Seip (right end), Allbright (quarterback), R. F. Stovall (left halfback), McCullam (right halfback), Gill (fullback).

Mississippi A&M
In the third week of play, LSU swamped Mississippi A&M 15–0.

The starting lineup was Hall (left end), Hillman (left tackle), Falcon (left guard), Stovall (center), Thomas (right guard), Pollock (right tackle), Seip (right end), Fenton (quarterback), R. F. Stovall (left halfback), McCullam (right halfback), Gill (fullback).

Sewanee

Sources:

LSU lost to SIAA champion Sewanee in New Orleans 15–6. According to Vanderbilt coach Dan McGugin, Sewanee won due to better punting.

Sewanee scored with an Aubrey Lanier touchdown and Moise drop kick in the first half. LSU scored when, after blocking a punt, Robert L. Stovall recovered the ball for a touchdown. Soon after, President William Howard Taft showed up to the game for about ten minutes. Sewanee added another touchdown.

The starting lineup was  Williams (left end), Faulkenberry (left tackle), Cheape (left guard), Juhan (center), Cox (right guard), Moise (right tackle), Gillem (right end), Brown (quarterback), Myers (left halfback), Lanier (right halfback), Hawkins (fullback).

Louisiana Industrial
On a Thursday, LSU beat Louisiana Industrial, 23–0, giving the team its only loss on the season.

Arkansas

Sources:

The Tigers were powerless to stop the favored Arkansas Razorbacks in a 16–0 loss. The game was characterized by several offsides penalties on both sides.

The starting lineup was Hall (left end), Hillman (left tackle), Drew (left guard), R. F. Stovall (center), Thomas (right guard), Seip (right tackle), R. L. Stovall (right end), Fenton (quarterback), Gill (left halfback), McCullum (right halfback), Tilley (fullback).

Transylvania
LSU defeated Transylvania 32–0, scoring at will in the second half.

Alabama
John Seip starred in the 12–6 victory over Alabama.  "The consensus of opinion was that Alabama would have won but for Pratt's absence."

The starting lineup was Hall (left end), Seip (left tackle), Thomas (left guard), Stovall (center), Drew (right guard), Hillman (tackle), R. Stovall (right end), Gill (quarterback), Howell (left halfback), McCollum (right halfback), Ryan (fullback).

Postseason
Fenton was selected All-Southern by John Heisman. End John Seip was selected such by Grantland Rice.

Roster

Roster from LSU: The Louisiana Tigers

References

LSU
LSU Tigers football seasons
LSU Tigers football